Zašto ne volim sneg is the fifth studio album by the Serbian rock band Smak, released in 1981. It was released as LP and music cassette. It contains seven tracks, most famously Smak's version of the Macedonian folk song "Zajdi, zajdi".
It was initially agreed by the entire band that this would be Točak's solo effort, but they were pushed by their label to make it a full-band recording, not a solo project..
'Južni voz' is a common live staple.

Track listing

Personnel 
 Dado Topić – vocals (A4)
 Zoran Živanović "Hoze" – vocals (A1, B3)
 Radomir Mihajlović "Točak" – guitar
 Laza Ristovski – keyboards
 Zoran Milanović – bass
 Slobodan Stojanović "Kepa" – drums

Legacy
In 2015 Zašto ne volim sneg album cover was ranked 64th on the list of 100 Greatest Album Covers of Yugoslav Rock published by web magazine Balkanrock.

References

External links

Smak albums
1981 albums
Serbian-language albums